Sibmean Sitchefboontham, is a Thai Muay Thai fighter.

Career
On May 25, 2017 Sibmuen challenged Takuya Imamura for his Rajadamnern Stadium 154 lbs title. He won the fight by decision.

On November 30, 2017 Sibmuen faced Buakiew Sitsongpeenong at the Omnoi Stadium. He was defeated by decision.

On February 19, 2018 Sibmuen lost his Rajadamnern Stadium 154 lbs title to Inthachai Chor.Hapayak by decision.

On June 27, 2018 Sibmuen faced Tsukuru Midorikawa for the vacant Rajadamnern Stadium 154 lbs title. He won the fight by decision.

On September 19, 2018 Sibmuen faced Buakiew Sitsongpeenong at Rajadamnern Stadium. He lost the fight by knockout from knees to the body in round 4.  

On February 17, 2019 Sibmuen challenged Hinata for his REBELS 154 lbs title in Tokyo, Japan. He lost the fight by knockout due to low kicks in the third round

Following the covid crisis Sibmuen went away from competition to go back working with his father.  During the same period he started documenting his career on his youtube channel and reached over 1.5 million subscribers in two years. In 2022 he made his return to competition for a celebrity fighting show where he defeated former Rajadamnern champion Jos Mendonca by unanimous decision.

Sibmuen took part in the 2022 Rajadamnern World Series in the welterweight division. He won his first group stage fight by knockout against Mohamed Cheboub.

Titles and accomplishments

Rajadamnern Stadium
 2017 Rajadamnern Stadium 154 lbs Champion
 2018 Rajadamnern Stadium 154 lbs Champion
 2022 Rajadamnern World Series 154 lbs Runner-up
Omnoi Stadium
2015 Omnoi Stadium 147 lbs Champion (one defense)

Muay Thai record

|- style="background:#fbb" 
| 2022-12-16 || Loss ||align="left" | Shadow Singmawynn || Rajadamnern World Series - Final || Bangkok, Thailand || Decision (Unanimous)|| 5 ||3:00 
|-
! style=background:white colspan=9 |
|- style="background:#cfc" 
| 2022-11-04 || Win ||align="left" | Mangkornkaw Sit Kaewprapon || Rajadamnern World Series - Semi Final || Bangkok, Thailand || Decision (Unanimous)|| 3 || 3:00 
|- style="background:#cfc" 
| 2022-09-30 || Win ||align="left" | Yodkhunpon Sitmonchai || Rajadamnern World Series - Group Stage || Bangkok, Thailand ||Decision (Unanimous) || 3 || 3:00
|- style="background:#cfc" 
| 2022-08-26 || Win ||align="left" | Amrane Sor.Suwannaran || Rajadamnern World Series - Group Stage || Bangkok, Thailand || KO (Middle kick)||  1|| 0:59 
|- style="background:#cfc" 
| 2022-07-22 || Win ||align="left" | Mohamed Cheboub  || Rajadamnern World Series - Group Stage || Bangkok, Thailand || KO (Left elbow) || 1 || 
|- style="background:#cfc" 
| 2022-04-02 || Win ||align="left" | Jos Mendonca || Idol Fight 2 || Bangkok, Thailand ||Decision (Unanimous) || 3 || 3:00
|-  style="background:#cfc;"
| 2019-06-22 || Win|| align=left| Roeung Sophorn || || Cambodia || Decision  || 5 || 3:00

|-  style="background:#cfc;"
| 2019-05-31 || Win|| align=left| Meun Sophea || Bayon TV || Cambodia || Decision  || 5 || 3:00
|-  style="background:#fbb;"
| 2019-02-17 || Loss || align=left| Hinata || PANCRASE REBELS RING.1|| Tokyo, Japan || KO (Low Kicks) || 3 || 0:26
|-
! style=background:white colspan=9 |
|-  style="background:#cfc;"
| 2018-12-19 || Win ||align=left| Konluang Pumpanmuang || Rajadamnern Stadium || Bangkok, Thailand || KO (Left Elbow) || 3 ||
|-  style="background:#c5d2ea;"
| 2018-10-11 || Draw ||align=left| Rungrat Pumpanmuang || Rajadamnern Stadium || Bangkok, Thailand || Decision || 5 || 3:00
|-  style="background:#cfc;"
| 2018-09-19 || Win||align=left| Buakiew Sitsongpeenong || Rajadamnern Stadium || Bangkok, Thailand || KO (Knees)|| 4 ||
|-  style="background:#cfc;"
| 2018-08-15 || Win ||align=left| Noppakao Gor.Geysanon || Rajadamnern Stadium|| Bangkok, Thailand || KO (Body Kick) || 4 ||
|-  style="background:#cfc;"
| 2018-06-27 || Win ||align=left| Tsukuru Midorikawa || Rajadamnern Stadium|| Bangkok, Thailand || Decision || 5 || 3:00
|-
! style=background:white colspan=9 |
|-  style="background:#cfc;"
| 2018-05-21 || Win ||align=left| Alex Bublea || All Star Fight 4 || Hong Kong || Decision || 3 || 3:00
|-  style="background:#cfc;"
| 2018-04-28|| Win ||align=left| Luis Cajaiba  || All Star Fight 3 || Bangkok, Thailand || Decision || 5 || 3:00
|-  style="background:#fbb;"
| 2018-02-19 || Loss ||align=left| Inthachai Chor.Hapayak || Rajadamnern Stadium || Bangkok, Thailand || Decision|| 5 || 3:00 
|-
! style=background:white colspan=9 |

|-  style="background:#cfc;"
| 2018-01-17 || Win||align=left| Buakiew Sitsongpeenong || Rajadamnern Stadium || Bangkok, Thailand || KO (Left Elbow) || 3 ||
|-  style="background:#fbb;"
| 2017-11-30 || Loss ||align=left| Buakiew Sitsongpeenong || Rajadamnern Stadium || Bangkok, Thailand || Decision|| 5 || 3:00
|-  style="background:#cfc;"
| 2017-09-30 || Win ||align=left| Andrei Kulebin || All Star Fight 2 || Bangkok, Thailand || Decision  || 3 || 3:00
|-  style="background:#cfc;"
| 2017-09-07 || Win ||align=left| Jojo 13coinresort || Rajadamnern Stadium || Bangkok, Thailand || Decision|| 5 || 3:00
|-  style="background:#cfc;"
| 2017-07-20 || Win ||align=left| Monsiam Lukmuangphet || Rajadamnern Stadium || Bangkok, Thailand || Decision|| 5 || 3:00
|-  style="background:#cfc;"
| 2017-05-25 || Win ||align=left| Takuya "T-98" Imamura || Rajadamnern Stadium || Bangkok, Thailand || Decision|| 5 || 3:00 
|-
! style=background:white colspan=9 |
|-  style="background:#c5d2ea;"
| 2016-10-23 || Draw ||align=left| Tsukuru Midorikawa || SNKA MAGNUM 42|| Tokyo, Japan || Decision || 5 || 3:00
|-  style="background:#fbb;"
| 2016-07-30 || Loss||align=left| Phayaluang Flukbamikiew|| Omnoi Stadium || Samut Sakhon, Thailand || Decision || 5 || 3:00
|-  style="background:#cfc;"
| 2016-07-09 || Win ||align=left| Navee J-Powerroof Puket || Omnoi Stadium || Samut Sakhon, Thailand || Decision || 5 || 3:00
|-  style="background:#cfc;"
| 2016-03-26 || Win ||align=left| Rafi Bohic || Omnoi Stadium || Samut Sakhon, Thailand || TKO (Doctor Stoppage)|| 4 || 
|-
! style=background:white colspan=9 |
|-  style="background:#fbb;"
| 2016-02-07 || Loss ||align=left| Phonek Or.Kwanmuang || Rajadamnern Stadium || Bangkok, Thailand || KO || 3 ||
|-  style="background:#cfc;"
| 2016-01-17 || Win ||align=left| Navee J-Powerroof Puket || Rajadamnern Stadium || Bangkok, Thailand || Decision || 5 || 3:00
|-  style="background:#cfc;"
| 2015-12-27 || Win ||align=left| Manachai YokkaoSaenchaigym || Rajadamnern Stadium || Bangkok, Thailand || Decision || 5 || 3:00
|-  style="background:#cfc;"
| 2015-10-25 || Win ||align=left| Phosailek Pakornpronsurin || Rajadamnern Stadium || Bangkok, Thailand || KO || 2 ||
|-  style="background:#cfc;"
| 2015-09-05 || Win||align=left| Vahik Sangmorakot  || Omnoi Stadium || Samut Sakhon, Thailand || Decision || 5 || 3:00
|-
! style=background:white colspan=9 |
|-  style="background:#fbb;"
| 2015-06-17 || Loss ||align=left| Mafiadam Tor.PhranThaksin|| Rajadamnern Stadium || Bangkok, Thailand || Decision || 5 || 3:00
|-  style="background:#fbb;"
| 2015-06-04 || Loss ||align=left| Phetmakok Sitdabmai  || Omnoi Stadium || Samut Sakhon, Thailand || Decision || 5 || 3:00
|-  style="background:#fbb;"
| 2015-04-27 || Loss ||align=left| Phonek Or.Kwanmuang || Rajadamnern Stadium || Bangkok, Thailand || Decision || 5 || 3:00
|-  style="background:#cfc;"
| 2015-03-08 || Win ||align=left| Jaknaronglek Sor.Julsen || Rajadamnern Stadium || Bangkok, Thailand || Decision || 5 || 3:00
|-  style="background:#cfc;"
| 2015-02-15 || Win ||align=left| Taythonglek Phetsaitong || Rajadamnern Stadium || Bangkok, Thailand || KO || 4 ||
|-  style="background:#cfc;"
| 2015-01-11 || Win ||align=left| Saphanpetch Sititisukto || Rajadamnern Stadium || Bangkok, Thailand || Decision || 5 || 3:00
|-  style="background:#fbb;"
| 2014-12-25 || Loss ||align=left| Kongdanai Sor.Sommai || Rajadamnern Stadium || Bangkok, Thailand || Decision || 5 || 3:00
|-  style="background:#fbb;"
| 2014-10-22 || Loss ||align=left| Pehtboonchu Sor.Sommai || Rajadamnern Stadium || Bangkok, Thailand || KO|| 4 || 
|-
| colspan=9 | Legend:

References

Sibmuen Sitchefboontham
Living people
1996 births
Sibmuen Sitchefboontham